The Ministry of Communication and Information Technology (abbreviated as Kominfo) is a ministry of the government of Indonesia that is responsible for communication, information affairs and internet censorship. The ministry reports to the president is and led by a minister.

The current ministry was established in 2001 by President Megawati Sukarnoputri after its predecessor was abolished by President Abdurrahman Wahid in 1999. The original Ministry was created during the National Revolution as the Department of Information (Departemen Penerangan/Deppen) formed in 19 August 1945.

Organization
The Ministry is organized into 7 directorates and 5 advisory commissions. 

 Office of the Deputy Minister
 Secretariat General
 Directorate General of Post and Information Technology Devices Resources
 Directorate General of Post and Information Technology Operation
 Directorate General of Informational Application
 Directorate General of Public Information and Communications
 Inspectorate General
 Agency of Research and Human Resource Development
 Special Advisor to the Minister on Law
 Special Advisor to the Minister on Social, Economics and Culture
 Special Advisor to the Minister on Communications and Mass Media
 Special Advisor to the Minister on Information Technology
 Special Advisor to the Minister on ICT Politics and Security

Criticism
The ministry is often criticized for its censorship, as it blocks websites "to protect its citizen from hoax". In 2020, the Director General Ministry Semuel Abrijani Pangerapan and Johnny G. Plate introduced a law that requires foreign companies to register under the Electronic System Operator list which could give the government access to the citizen's personal info and threaten the company to block access from the country if the company did not register. The law was revised and passed in 2021.  In July 2022, a ban was implemented for several notable websites such as PayPal, Epic Games, Steam, Origin, and Yahoo, and games such as Counter-Strike: Global Offensive and Dota 2 as they did not register under the ministry's new law.

References

Communication and Informatics
Indonesia
Indonesia
Censorship in Indonesia
Human rights abuses in Indonesia